This page lists the World Best Year Performance in 1999 in both the men's and the women's race walking distances: 20 km and 50 km (outdoor). One of the main events during this season were the 1999 World Athletics Championships in Seville, Spain. Guatemala's Julio René Martínez broke the world record in the men's 20 km, clocking 1:17:46 on May 8, 1999, in Eisenhüttenstadt, Germany.

Abbreviations
All times shown are in hours:minutes:seconds

Men's 20 km

Records

1999 World Year Ranking

Men's 50 km

Records

1999 World Year Ranking

Women's 20 km

Records

1999 World Year Ranking

See also
1999 IAAF World Race Walking Cup

References
marciaitaliana
IAAF

1999
Race Walking Year Ranking, 1999